The 1944 Wellington City mayoral election was part of the New Zealand local elections held that same year. In 1944, election were held for the Mayor of Wellington plus other local government positions including fifteen city councillors. The polling was conducted using the standard first-past-the-post electoral method.

The incumbent Mayor, Thomas Hislop did not stand for another term. Instead, Will Appleton stood as the candidate for the Citizens' Association. Trade unionist James Roberts who was the President of the Labour Party was his Party's candidate.

Background
Citizens'
Three members of the Citizens' Association were nominated for the mayoralty:

Will Appleton, city councillor since 1931 and chairman of the council Works Committee
Thomas Hislop, the Mayor of Wellington since 1931
William Gaudin, city councillor since 1927 and chairman of the council Libraries Committee

Despite the open challenge to him Hislop (who had been mayor for 13 years) was again selected by a ballot of the Citizens' Electoral Committee. Appleton said he would stand for mayor as an independent despite not being granted the Citizens' nomination in pursuance of a promise he gave to a deputation of over 100 people who implored him to stand. This caused concern for the Citizens' Association of vote splitting and a repeat of the 1912 election where competing centre-right candidates allowed a Labour mayor to be elected. Declining arbitration, Appleton got his wish after discussions when Hislop (albeit reluctantly) agreed to stand aside in the interests of unity.

Labour
The Labour Party had five people nominated for the mayoralty:

Peter Butler, secretary of the Wellington General Labourers' Union and former city councillor (1933-41)
Charles Chapman, MP for  since 1928 and ex-city councillor (1919-25, 1929-41)
Harry Combs, MP for  since 1938
Robert McKeen, MP for  since 1922 and former city councillor (1925-41)
James Roberts, the President of the Labour Party since 1937

McKeen and later Combs declined nomination and withdrew from the process. At a selection meeting 87 delegates, representing approximately 30,000 members, selected Roberts ahead of Butler and Chapman in an exhaustive ballot. The Communist Party did not contest the mayoralty and decided to endorse Roberts stating the party supported the election of a Labour mayor.

Mayoralty results

Councillor results

Notes

References

Mayoral elections in Wellington
1944 elections in New Zealand
Politics of the Wellington Region
1940s in Wellington